Maria Likthtenchtein, also spelled Likhtenstein or Liechtenstein (born 7 February 1976) is a retired female volleyball player who played for the Russian (1993–1996) and the Croatian (1997–2007) national volleyball teams. She played for clubs in Russia, Croatia, Italy, Belgium, Greece and Turkey.
Her retirement was announced in 2013, she won club and national team titles during her career.

Career

Club
Her club career spanned in Russia, Croatia, Italy, Belgium, Greece and Turkey. She won the Russian Super League on five occasions, all with Uralochka Ekaterinburg and has also won the Croatian League and the Belgian League.

National teams
She was part of the Russia women's national volleyball team champion at the 1993 Women's European Volleyball Championship and third place at the 1995 Women's European Volleyball Championship.

From 1997 onwards she competed for the Croatia women's national volleyball team at the 1998 FIVB Volleyball Women's World Championship in Japan and the runners-up team at the 1999 Women's European Volleyball Championship.

Clubs
This is an incomplete list of the clubs she played for.
  Uralochka Ekaterinburg (before 1998)
  OK Dubrovnik (1998–1999)
  OK Kaštela (1999–2000)
  HAOK Mladost (2000–2001)
  Uralochka-NTMK (2001–2002)
  Terra Sarda Tortolì (2004–2005)
  Dauphines Charleroi (2005–2006)
  Euphony Tongere (2006–2007)

References

1976 births
Living people
Russian women's volleyball players
Place of birth missing (living people)
Croatian women's volleyball players
Expatriate volleyball players in Italy
Expatriate volleyball players in Belgium